The 1981 Talladega 500 was a NASCAR Winston Cup Series racing event that took place on August 2, 1981, at Alabama International Motor Speedway in Talladega, Alabama.

Background
Talladega Superspeedway, originally known as Alabama International Motor Superspeedway (AIMS), is a motorsports complex located north of Talladega, Alabama. It is located on the former Anniston Air Force Base in the small city of Lincoln. The track is a Tri-oval and was constructed by International Speedway Corporation, a business controlled by the France Family, in the 1960s. Talladega is most known for its steep banking and the unique location of the start/finish line - located just past the exit to pit road. The track currently hosts the NASCAR series such as the Sprint Cup Series, Xfinity Series, and the Camping World Truck Series.

Race report
An all-American grid of 42 drivers would appear at this race; Joe Booher would receive credit for the last-place finish due to an engine issue on the fourth lap. It took more than three hours to resolve the 188 lap race. There were eight caution periods for 36 laps with 39 lead changes. Rick Wilson crashed at least four times in this race before finally finishing his Oldsmobile off on lap 148.

This race marked the end of the road for an iconic sponsorship as the Wood Brothers' #21 Ford hit the track in its famous Purolator colors for the final time, ending a partnership that dated back to 1971. Alabama's own Neil Bonnett qualified well and led some laps early on before a mechanical gremlin put the #21 on the sidelines. Morgan Shepherd and his crew chief Darrell Bryant and a few of his own crew members got into a fight before this race. That led to Shepherd being released and Joe Millikan being hired for the rest of the season. Shepherd would qualify for the race in 15th place. However, he would drop out of the race on lap 55 due to engine problems and finish in 36th place.

Darrell Waltrip, Terry Labonte, and Ron Bouchard were nose-to-tail going into the final lap. Coming through the trioval to the finish line, Labonte tried to pass Waltrip on the outside, Waltrip forcing him high, up against the wall.
It would be the only Cup victory of his career. The thrilling win would propel him to that year's NASCAR Rookie of the Year award. Bouchard and Pete Hamilton are the only NASCAR Cup Series winners from Massachusetts to date.

Terry Herman would make his first NASCAR Cup start in this race while Sandy Satullo, II would make his last. Stan Barrett would make the best finish of his career in this race; he would go on to father independent driver Stanton Barrett. Richard Childress would make one of his final driving appearances before becoming a full-time owner of Richard Childress Racing.

The finish of the race was shown on the CBS Evening News that night, due to the technical problems that happened during the race.

Qualifying

Finishing order

 Ron Bouchard†
 Darrell Waltrip
 Terry Labonte
 Harry Gant
 Bobby Allison
 Lake Speed
 Kyle Petty
 Jody Ridley
 Stan Barrett
 Dave Marcis
 Bill Elliott
 Elliott Forbes-Robinson
 Benny Parsons†
 Terry Herman
 Dick May†
 Jimmy Means
 Cecil Gordon†
 Tommy Gale†
 Bobby Wawak†
 Rick Wilson*
 Rusty Wallace*
 Joe Ruttman*
 Ricky Rudd
 Lennie Pond*
 Gary Balough*
 Richard Childress*
 Mike Potter*
 Cale Yarborough*
 Dale Earnhardt*†
 Bruce Hill*
 Sandy Satullo, II*
 Buddy Baker*†
 Connie Saylor*†
 Tim Richmond*†
 Mike Alexander*
 Morgan Shepherd*
 Neil Bonnett*†
 Jack Ingram*
 James Hylton*†
 Richard Petty*
 Buddy Arrington*
 Joe Booher*

† signifies that the driver is known to be deceased 
* Driver failed to finish race

Standings after the race

References

Talladega 500
Talladega 500
NASCAR races at Talladega Superspeedway